Dr. Kildare's Strange Case is a 1940 American drama film directed by Harold S. Bucquet.  This was the fifth of a total of ten Dr. Kildare pictures. Horace MacMahon joined the cast regulars in the series as taxi driver "Foghorn" Murphy.

Plot
Dr. James Kildare finds competition for the affections of nurse Mary Lamont in the person of wealthy brain surgeon Dr. Gregory Lane. Kildare has not proposed to Mary because of his poor financial situation as an intern. Kildare's mentor, Dr. Leonard Gillespie, is informed that Paul Messenger, whose daughter Kildare cured in The Secret of Dr. Kildare, has arranged for Kildare to be offered a prestigious, lucrative position with the Messenger Institute. In the meantime Kildare has arranged for his inspiring but crusty mentor to see a cancer specialist about the melanoma Gillespie is battling.

Despite the temptation of a high salary and a new home, Kildare turns down the job offer to continue to remain near Gillespie. As a result, Mary gives up all hope of marrying Kildare and is assigned as a staff surgical nurse to Lane. Kildare and Lane are put together on a case involving an unidentified patient with a skull fracture who is refusing the operation that would save his life. Lane knows the patient urgently needs the surgery but has lost confidence in himself because too many of his patients have died on the operating table. Kildare convinces Lane that Gillespie has full confidence in his skills and Lane proceeds with the operation.

When the patient wakes up, he shows clear signs of insanity, putting Lane's career in jeopardy and subject to criminal prosecution. Kildare is convinced that the man was mentally ill before the accident which fractured his skull, and thus Lane had a legal right to perform the operation. He risks his own career by using a new treatment, the "insulin shock cure," which succeeds. Questioning the patient for his identity and background, Kildare finds the man's estranged wife and learns that he had gradually lost his sanity over a five-year separation.

Mary puts her own career on the line to protect Kildare until he returns with the wife. Gillespie fires Kildare to get him to propose to Mary. Seeing the couple reunited, she accepts, even knowing that their engagement will of necessity be a protracted one. Gillespie reveals that once again he has plotted to have Kildare find his own way through a difficult situation. Turning the tables, Kildare extracts a promise from Gillespie to accept the care of the cancer specialist in return for keeping Kildare on as his assistant.

Cast

 Lew Ayres as Dr. James Kildare
 Lionel Barrymore as Dr. Leonard Gillespie
 Laraine Day as Nurse Mary Lamont
 Shepperd Strudwick as Dr. Gregory Lane
 Samuel S. Hinds as Dr. Stephen Kildare
 Emma Dunn as Mrs. Martha Kildare
 Nat Pendleton as Joe Wayman
 Walter Kingsford as Dr. S.J. Carew
 Alma Kruger as Molly Byrd
 John Eldredge as Henry Adams
 Nell Craig as "Nosey" Parker
 Marie Blake as Sally
 Charles Waldron as Dr. Squires
 George Lessey as Rufus Ingersoll
 Tom Collins as Dr. Joiner
 George Reed as Conover
 Paul Porcasi as Tony
 Horace McMahon as J. Harold "Fog Horn" Murphy
 Frank Orth as Mike Ryan
 Margaret Seddon as Mrs. Julia Cray
 Fay Helm as Mrs. Henry Adams

References

External links

 
 
 
 
 

1940 films
1940 drama films
American black-and-white films
American drama films
Films directed by Harold S. Bucquet
Films set in New York City
Films set in hospitals
Metro-Goldwyn-Mayer films
1940s English-language films
1940s American films